Scott Hayden (March 31, 1882 — September 16, 1915) was an American composer of ragtime music.

Life 

Born in Sedalia, Missouri, he was the son of Marion and Julia Hayden. Hayden is remembered today for the four rags he composed in collaboration with Scott Joplin, "Sunflower Slow Drag," "Something Doing," "Felicity Rag," "Kismet Rag" and also for another composition he wrote himself, "Pear Blossoms". There was a family connection of sorts between the two men, since Joplin's first wife, Belle Hayden, had been Scott Hayden's sister-in-law. Hayden married Nora Wright and lived with the Joplins in St. Louis.

Nora died giving birth to a daughter in 1901. Hayden moved to Chicago, got a job as an elevator operator in the Cook County Hospital, and married Jeanette Wilkins.  A slender, handsome man of delicate health, he died in Chicago of pulmonary tuberculosis, leaving "Pear Blossoms" unfinished.

References

External links

 Answers.com
 

1882 births
1915 deaths
20th-century deaths from tuberculosis
African-American classical composers
American classical composers
African-American male classical composers
American male classical composers
Musicians from Chicago
Musicians from St. Louis
People from Sedalia, Missouri
Ragtime composers
Scott Joplin
Tuberculosis deaths in Illinois
20th-century American male musicians